Persidago, which stands for Persatuan Sepakbola Indonesia Daerah Kabupaten Gorontalo (en: Football Association of Indonesia Gorontalo Regency Region) is an  Indonesian football club based in Limboto, Gorontalo Regency, Gorontalo. They play in Liga 3.
Their home stadium is Gelora 23 January Stadium.

In 2019, they entered Round 16 of the  Piala Indonesia after successfully beating Persipura Jayapura with 2-2 on aggregate (1-0 home, 2-1 away).

Honours
 Liga Nusantara/Liga 3 (Gorontalo zone)
 Champions (4): 2014, 2017, 2019, 2021

References

External links
 Persidago Gorontalo at Liga-Indonesia.co.id

 
Football clubs in Indonesia
Football clubs in Gorontalo
Association football clubs established in 1959
1959 establishments in Indonesia